Marrit Leenstra (born 18 October 1973) is a Dutch professional beach volleyball and indoor volleyball player born in Emmen, Drenthe.

In indoor volleyball Leenstra started her career in 1983 at OSV Pegasus Ter Apel. Other teams she played for were Etiflex Ommen, Martinus Amstelveen, Vini Monteschiavo Jesi, Granzotto San Dona, Fiqurella Firenze and Mirabi Iandia Teodora Ravenna. From 1988 to 1992 she was part of the Dutch youth teams in her age-range. In 1992 she joined the Dutch senior volleyball team and was selected for the 1992 Summer Olympics in Barcelona, finishing 6th. Four years later, during the 1996 Summer Olympics she and her team finished 5th. Leenstra stayed in the Dutch team until 1998.

She started her international beach volleyball career already in 2001 after finishing her indoor contract in Italy. She teamed up with Dutch star Rebekka Kadijk, whose sister Debora decided to quit beach volleyball after the 2000 Summer Olympics. In 2001, 2002 and 2004, Kadijk and Leenstra won three Dutch national titles. In Basel 2002 they reached the final of the European Championships. They lost this final, but still won a silver medal. Their main achievement was made in 2003 when they won the World Cup meeting in Lianyungang (China). They qualified for the 2004 Summer Olympics which was not as successful as they hoped before the start. After the Olympics they decided to split up. Leenstra's next partner was Sanne Keizer with whom she did not reach any notable results with, except a 4th place at a tournament in Montreal.

References

External links
 Official site
 
 
 

1973 births
Living people
Beach volleyball players at the 2004 Summer Olympics
Dutch women's beach volleyball players
Dutch women's volleyball players
Olympic beach volleyball players of the Netherlands
Olympic volleyball players of the Netherlands
Sportspeople from Emmen, Netherlands
Volleyball players at the 1992 Summer Olympics
Volleyball players at the 1996 Summer Olympics